Patty Loveless is the debut album from country music artist Patty Loveless. It was released in January 1987. Among its tracks were Billboard Top Country Singles minor hits, "Lonely Days, Lonely Nights," "I Did," "After All," and "Wicked Ways." The album peaked at #35 on the Top Country Albums charts in 1986.

Track listing
"Lonely Days, Lonely Nights" (Karen Staley) – 2:49
"I Did" (Loveless) – 2:47
"You Are Everything" (Guy Clark, Keith Sykes) – 2:27
"Blue Is Not a Word" (Jo-El Sonnier, Judy Ball) – 2:57
"Slow Healing Heart" (Jim Rushing) – 3:42
"After All" (Jimbeau Hinson, Harry Stinson) – 3:51
"Wicked Ways" (Staley) – 3:06
"Half Over You" (Staley) – 3:08
"Some Blue Moons Ago" (Steve Earle, Richard Bennett) – 2:19
"Sounds of Loneliness" (Loveless) – 4:18

Production

Emory Gordy Jr., Tony Brown: Producers
Jeff Coppage: Engineer, Assistant Engineer
Mark J. Coddington: Engineer, Assistant Engineer
Tim Kish: Engineer, Assistant Engineer

Russ Martin: Engineer, Assistant Engineer
Robbie Rose: Engineer
Ron Treat: Engineer, Mixing
Glenn Meadows: Mastering

Personnel

Linda Alosko - viola
Richard Bennett - acoustic, electric & steel guitars
Tony Brown - keyboards, synthesizers
Larry Byrom - acoustic, electric & bass guitars
John Catchings - cello
Glen Duncan - fiddle
Ray Flacke - acoustic & electric guitars
Sara Fogel - viola
Paul Franklin - steel guitar, dobro, pedabro
Emory Gordy, Jr. - bass, acoustic guitars, string arrangements
Jim Grosjean - viola

John Barlow Jarvis - keyboards, piano
Jerry Kroon - drums, percussion
Patty Loveless - acoustic guitars, tambourine, lead & harmony vocals
Mac McAnally - acoustic guitars
Connie McCollister - violin, concertmaster
Edgar Meyer - bass, double bass, cello
Weldon Myrick - steel guitar
Mary K. Parker - violin
Reggie Young: Electric Guitars
Paul Davis, Vince Gill, Lyle Lovett, Karen Staley, Harry Stinson - harmony vocals

Chart performance

Single releases

Lonely Days, Lonely Nights
"Lonely Days, Lonely Nights",  was the first single from the album, recorded at MCA/Nashville in the fall of 1985.  It was one of a five-song singles record contract she had at the time with the label, prior to her receiving an album contract. An uncredited review in Cashbox "a boot-tapper that shows off her strong voice and rhythmic phrasing."

Included as that song's B-side was "Country, I'm Coming Home To You", written by a Loveless in 1974 at age 17. The song was one of her favorites, and when she returned to Nashville in 1985, she recorded this as the "B" side on her first single.  It was never included on any of Loveless' albums.

The song charted for eight weeks on the Billboard Hot Country Singles and Tracks chart, reaching #46 during the week of January 25, 1986.

Wicked Ways
"Wicked Ways" was recorded at MCA/Nashville in the fall of 1986, with the single being released in  October 1986. It was the second single released from the album.

The song charted for four weeks on the Billboard Hot Country Singles and Tracks chart, reaching #49 during the week of January 10, 1987.

I Did
"I Did" was the song played by Loveless' brother, Roger Ramey, to Tony Brown at MCA in 1985.  After hearing the recording, Brown signed Loveless to MCA. The song was first released to radio stations on Valentine's Day, 1986 with a special red vinyl version. It garnered a significant amount of airplay.  With this, Loveless was signed to a multi-album contract. However, it was withdrawn by MCA as it was believed that it was drawing attention away from other country artists signed to the label at the time; however, it was re-released a month later.

It was re-released in March 1987 and charted for five weeks on the Billboard Hot Country Singles and Tracks chart, reaching #56 during the week of 11 April 1987.

After All
"After All" was recorded at MCA/Nashville in early 1986, with the single being released in October 1986. It was the fourth single released from the album.

References

1987 debut albums
Patty Loveless albums
MCA Records albums
Albums produced by Tony Brown (record producer)
Albums produced by Emory Gordy Jr.